"Sisters Are Doin' It for Themselves" is a song by British pop duo Eurythmics and American singer Aretha Franklin. A modern feminist anthem, it was written by Eurythmics members Annie Lennox and David A. Stewart and featured on both Eurythmics' Be Yourself Tonight (1985) and Franklin's Who's Zoomin' Who? (1985) albums. The duo originally intended to perform with Tina Turner, who was unavailable at the time and so they flew to Detroit and recorded with Franklin instead. The track also features three of Tom Petty's Heartbreakers: Stan Lynch on drums, Benmont Tench on organ, and Mike Campbell on lead guitar, plus session bassist Nathan East.

Reception
Released as a single by RCA Records in October 1985, "Sisters Are Doin' It for Themselves" was highly successful, reaching number 9 on the UK Singles Chart and number 18 on the US Billboard Hot 100. The song was nominated for a Grammy Award for Best R&B Performance by a Duo or Group with Vocals.

Cash Box said that the song is "a rousing, soulful tune with a driving R&B feel."  Billboard said it has "two varieties of charisma plus a furious funk production."

Music video
This music video was taped at Detroit's Music Hall. The video is interspersed with clips from old black and white films, including 1962's A Kind of Loving. The video uses the single version of the song, as opposed to the album version.

Track listings
7-inch
A: "Sisters Are Doin' It for Themselves" (7-inch version) – 4:35
B: "I Love You Like a Ball and Chain" (LP version) – 4:08

12-inch
A1: "Sisters Are Doin' It for Themselves" (LP version) – 5:54
B1: "Sisters Are Doin' It for Themselves" (ET mix) – 7:53
B2: "I Love You Like a Ball and Chain" (LP version) – 4:08

Credits
Eurythmics
 Annie Lennox – vocals, keyboards
 David A. Stewart – guitars, keyboards

Additional personnel
 Nathan East – bass guitar
 Stan Lynch – drums
 Mike Campbell – lead guitar
 Benmont Tench – organ
 Aretha Franklin – guest vocals
 The Charles Williams Singers – gospel choir

Charts

Cover versions
 The song was performed by the cartoon character Lisa Simpson (as sung by actress Yeardley Smith) along with Lisa's aunts Patty and Selma Bouvier as well as Ann Wilson and Nancy Wilson of Heart on The Yellow Album released in 1998.
 In 2005, The Pointer Sisters recorded a cover version of the song with Belgian singer Natalia. The single was released only in Belgium in October 2005 and reached number two on the Belgian singles chart.
 The television show Xena: Warrior Princess featured a cover of the song by actress Lucy Lawless and Gillian Iliana Waters in the episode Lyre, Lyre, Hearts on Fire.

Live cover performances
 In 1998, the Spice Girls performed a live cover version of the song on their Spiceworld Tour, as a duet between Melanie C (Sporty Spice) and Mel B (Scary Spice). They also performed it on TFI Friday.
 In 2011, Christina Aguilera, Martina McBride, Florence Welch, Jennifer Hudson & Yolanda Adams covered this song at 53rd Grammy Awards.

References

External links
Music video - YouTube
 Lyrics of the song

1985 songs
1985 singles
Eurythmics songs
Aretha Franklin songs
Songs with feminist themes
RCA Records singles
Songs written by Annie Lennox
Songs written by David A. Stewart
Song recordings produced by Dave Stewart (musician and producer)
Female vocal duets